Sékou Soumah (born 18 August 1974) is a Guinean footballer who played as a midfielder. He played in two matches for the Guinea national football team in 1994. He was also named in Guinea's squad for the 1994 African Cup of Nations tournament.

References

1974 births
Living people
Guinean footballers
Guinea international footballers
1994 African Cup of Nations players
Place of birth missing (living people)
Association football midfielders
Willem II (football club) players
Eredivisie players
Guinean expatriate footballers
Expatriate footballers in the Netherlands
Guinean expatriate sportspeople in the Netherlands